Charles Rochussen (Kralingen, 1 August 1814 – Rotterdam 22 September 1894) was a 19th-century painter from Rotterdam, the Netherlands, who was also known as an illustrator and printmaker.

Charles was the second son of the wealthy businessman and art collector Hendrik Rochussen (1779–1852), who was himself an amateur draftsman of some distinction and owned an extensive art and history library.

His brother Henri Rochussen (1812–89) became a painter.  While still a child, Charles showed a talent for drawing; between 1831 and 1834 he produced watercolor studies of birds. However, it was decided that he would pursue a career in business.

He worked for a few years in an office before resolving at the age of 22 to turn to painting. In 1837 he enrolled at the academy in The Hague, where he was taught by Wijnand Nuijen (1813–39) and, after Nuyen's death, by Anthonie Waldorp (1803–66).

During his Hague period, which lasted until 1843 (or, according to some sources, 1846), he painted landscapes and beach and village views. From 1849 to 1869 he lived in Amsterdam and thereafter in Rotterdam. He started painting looser, more along the lines of the upcoming Impressionism movement.

References

External links 
  Works in the Rijksmuseum
Charles Rochussen on Artnet
 
 
Oxford Grove Art

1814 births
1894 deaths
Painters from Rotterdam
Dutch illustrators
19th-century Dutch painters
Dutch male painters
Dutch printmakers
19th-century Dutch male artists